In the philosophy of perception, critical realism is the theory that some of our sense-data (for example, those of primary qualities) can and do accurately represent external objects, properties, and events, while other of our sense-data (for example, those of secondary qualities and perceptual illusions) do not accurately represent any external objects, properties, and events. Put simply, critical realism highlights a mind-dependent aspect of the world that reaches to understand (and comes to an understanding of) the mind-independent world.

Some precursors

Locke
According to Locke—following a tradition which can be traced back to the ancient (Democritus) and modern (Galileo Galilei, Isaac Newton) atomism—some sense-data, namely the sense-data of secondary qualities (i.e. colours, tastes, smells, sounds), do not represent anything in the external world, even if they are caused by external qualities (primary qualities). By its talk of sense-data and representation, this theory depends on or presupposes the truth of representationalism.

Descartes
René Descartes developed the theory that, since we could not definitely prove anything we experienced, the only thing which is sure to exist is our mind. He explains this by stating that in order to experience anything—real or fake—we first have to exist at all. That led to his famous saying "Cogito, ergo sum." (I think, therefore I am.).

American critical realism
The American critical realist movement was a response both to direct realism, as well as to idealism and pragmatism.  In very broad terms, American critical realism was a form of representative realism, in which there are objects that stand as mediators between independent real objects and perceivers. Prominent developers of American critical realism are Roy Wood Sellars and his son Wilfrid Sellars, and Maurice Mandelbaum.

One innovation was that these mediators are not ideas (British empiricism), but properties, essences, or "character complexes".

British critical realism
Similar developments occurred in the UK.  Major figures included Samuel Alexander, John Cook Wilson,  H. A. Prichard, H. H. Price, and C. D. Broad.

German critical realism
Nicolai Hartmann renewed the interest in the critical realist theory in Germany.

See also
 Anti-realism
 Critical realism (philosophy of the social sciences)
 New realism (philosophy)
 Subtle realism

Notes

Further reading
 Coelho, Ivo, 2010. "Critical Realism." ACPI Encyclopedia of Philosophy. Ed. Johnson J. Puthenpurackal. (Bangalore, ATC).1:341–344.

Perception
Philosophical realism
Epistemological theories